The 1922 Saint Mary's Saints football team was an American football team that represented Saint Mary's College of California during the 1922 college football season.  In their second season under head coach Slip Madigan, the Gaels compiled a 3–6 record and were outscored by their opponents by a combined total of 151 to 67.

Schedule

References

Saint Mary's
Saint Mary's Gaels football seasons
Saint Mary's Saints football